The Levallois Sporting Club Judo is a judo club affiliated to the Levallois Sporting Club. It's one of the biggest judo club in France with 800 members. Champions of the club include Teddy Riner, Gévrise Émane and Benjamin Darbelet.

History 
The first judo club in Levallois was founded in 1949. In 1984, the club was integrated into the Levallois Sporting Club, a brand new omnisport club. In a few years, the club became one of the most important judo club in France and in 1996, Marie-Claire Restoux became the first Olympic champion in club history. Since then, the LSC Judo is home to a multitude of champions like Teddy Riner and Gévrise Émane. Its head coach is Roger Vachon  who is also a member of the selection committee for the French team.

Notable judokas

Present 
 Matthieu Dafreville
 Benjamin Darbelet
 Gévrise Émane
 Teddy Riner

Past 
 Cathy Fleury
 Stephanie Possamai
 Marie-Claire Restoux
 Gella Vandecaveye

See also 
 Levallois Sporting Club

External links 
 Site officiel
 LSC official website

References 

Judo organizations
Judo in France